Yakutopus is a monotypic genus of Russian sheet weavers containing the single species, Yakutopus xerophilus. It was first described by K. Y. Eskov in 1990, and is only found in Russia.

See also
 List of Linyphiidae species (Q–Z)

References

Linyphiidae
Monotypic Araneomorphae genera
Spiders of Russia